Harold Johnson may refer to:

Sports
 Harold Johnson (basketball) (1920–1999), American professional basketball player
 Harold Johnson (boxer) (1928–2015), professional boxer
 Harold Johnson (cyclist), Australian cyclist
 Harold Johnson (sportscaster) (born c. 1948), sports director of WSOC-TV in Charlotte, North Carolina, 1980–2006

Other
 Harold T. Johnson (1907–1988), American politician
 Harold Keith Johnson (1912–1983), American general
 Money Johnson (Harold Johnson, 1918–1978), American jazz musician
 Harold Johnson (astronomer) (1921–1980), American astronomer
 Harold Johnson (game designer), designer on the Dungeons & Dragons role-playing game
 Harold R. Johnson (1957-2022), Canadian lawyer

See also
 Harry Johnson (disambiguation)
 Harald Johnsson (1898–1987), Swedish politician
 Harold Johnston (disambiguation)
 List of people with surname Johnson